Muhammad Taufik bin Batisah (Jawi: محمد تيوفيك بن بتيسه; born 10 December 1981) is a Singaporean singer-songwriter best known for winning the first season of the reality TV series Singapore Idol.

Early life and education
Taufik was born to a Malay family of both Indian and Buginese descent. His parents divorced when he was 13 years old. He attended Boon Lay Primary School, Jurong Secondary School before graduating from Singapore Polytechnic.

Music career
Taufik first started out as a singer in a local group called Bonafide, playing a mixture of hip hop and R&B with fellow rapper, Mark Subramaniam whose stage name is Mark Bonafide.

Taufik participated in the first season of the reality TV series Singapore Idol in 2004. On 1 December 2004, Taufik was crowned the first ever Singapore Idol at the Singapore Indoor Stadium before an audience of more than 8,000 fans and 1.8 million viewers across the country. He scored a recording deal with Sony BMG and a management deal under Hype Records' artiste management arm, ArtisteNetworks. It was later revealed that Taufik had won 682,000 of the 1.1 million votes cast that night, while his opponent Sylvester Sim managed 418,000 votes.

Following his win, Taufik clinched a string of endorsements for brands such as Harmuni Rice, Samsung, 7-Eleven stores and HSC drinks. He was the first Singapore artiste to endorse for the Swiss watch-maker, Swatch.

On 14 January 2005, Taufik released his first English album Blessings. The album included Taufik's hits from the competition such as Me and Mrs Jones, Let's Stay Together, Superstition as well as the Idol winning song I Dream. Taufik also co-wrote one track on the album titled Close 2 You. Blessings went on to a smashing sale of 36,000 copies, making into the Singapore Guinness Book of Records as the best selling local English album in the past decade. It remains a record unbroken in the Singapore music industry.

On 19 April 2005, Taufik held his first solo concert showcase An Evening With Taufik at the Kallang Theatre. Fresh from recovering from tonsillitis (resulted from a non-stop four months performing schedule), he charmed both the media and full-house audience with his soulful singing and smooth on-stage moves.

In 2006, Taufik released his second album All Because of You where he wrote and produced eight of the tracks. The English-Malay album spurred off a string of hits and further opened doors to the Malay music industry. Title track All Because of You made its debut that the finals of the second season of Singapore Idol. The three Malay singles on the album Usah Lepaskan, Sesuatu Janji and Sombong took the Malay music industry by storm. He was named the Most Sellable Artiste at MediaCorp Suria's People's Choice Awards and was also awarded the Most Popular Male Artiste Award at the regional Anugerah Planet Muzik 2006. Winning Favourite Artist Singapore at the 2006 MTV Asia Awards further elevated Taufik's career to further heights. An iconic role model, Taufik was also voted as the Winner of Kid's Choice Wannabe Award (Singapore) at the Nickelodeon Kids' Choice Award 2006.

Taufik continued to shine as the top artiste in Singapore, garnering the Most Popular Male Personality Award at Suria's Annual TV awards, Pesta Perdana 2007, the Nickelodeon Kid's Choice Wannabe Award (Singapore) for the second consecutive year, and also the Most Popular Artiste (Singapore) Award, Most Popular Song – Usah Lepaskan (Singapore) Award and the Best Local Song – Usah Lepaskan(Singer/Composer/Lyricist) Award at the Anugerah Planet Muzik 2007. Usah Lepaskan was also the Number 1 Song of the Year on Ria 89.7FM.

In 2007, he debuted his Malaysian album titled, Teman Istimewa (Special Friend) on 5 September and was the album long-awaited by the Malaysian Fiknatics (as his fans are called). Taufik produced 90% of this album and three songs are the Malay version of his earlier English songs  Untukmu (First), Berserah (Holding On) and Janjiku Padamu (I Promise Forever). Seribu Tahun (A Thousand Years), a song which he co-wrote, swept the Malaysian radio charts after it became the theme song for Malaysia's Channel TV3 hit drama series, Kerana Cintaku Saerah (Because of My Love Saerah).

In 2008, Taufik won the Most Popular Artiste (Singapore) Award and Most Popular Song (Singapore) Award for his composition Berserah (Surrender) as well as the Best Singapore Artiste Award at Anugerah Planet Muzik 2008. He also received the Singapore Youth Award (Arts and Culture), awarded by the National Youth Council, in recognition of his achievements in the music industry and for being a role model to the younger generation. Meanwhile, Taufik's music compositions also received greater recognition as Berserah took the No. 1 spot for Song of the Year and Teman Istimewa took 5th place on the RIA 89.7FM radio station's 2008 Top 30 Countdown.

Taufik also launched his fourth music album Suria Hatiku (Light of My Heart). This critically acclaimed Malay album showcased a wide variety of songs of different genres and had spurned multiple Number No. 1 hits such as Gadis Itu (That Girl), Nafasku (My Breathe), Hey and Kepadanya (For Him). The album also featured music collaborations between his mentor, Ken Lim, renowned music producer, M. Nasir, and singer, Hady Mirza.

Taufik was named the Most Popular Singapore Artiste for the third consecutive year at the Anugerah Planet Muzik Award 2009. His composition Usah Lepaskan was awarded the top Malay song with the highest royalties by COMPASS. Taufik also performed at the Angureah Planet Muzik Award held in Jakarta and the Singapore Day 2009 event in London. He was also invited to represent Singapore to perform at the ASEAN – Korea Commemorative Summit in Korea and performed at APEC Singapore 2009's "Singapore Evening at The Esplanade".

The year 2010 proved to be an exuberant start for Taufik. Besides fronting the finale performance at the Chingay Parade 2010 and performing for the second consecutive time in Seoul under the invitation of the Ministry of Culture, Sports and Tourism of Korea as well as Singapore's NAC, he continued to receive recognition for his music. He earned the top honour roll of six major awards at the first AnugeraHitz.sg Awards, which honoured the best in the local Malay music industry. The year also saw him diversifying his art and making his theatrical debut in Dick Lee's Fried Rice Paradise – The Musical.

In 2011, he was part of the "Home" video project under Total Defence Campaign and also fronted the "WeAreOne" fund raising project for the Japan tsunami. He also released an Eid ul-Fitr collaboration album Kenangan Di Hari Raya (Memories on Eid) with Hady Mirza.

In August of that year, he represented Singapore and performed with the Asia Traditional Orchestra for Korea's Independence Day in Seoul.
He also wrote and recorded a duet single Aku Bersahaja (Simply Me) with Indonesian diva Rossa. The pair debuted the single at Rossa's "Harmoni Cinta" Concert at Esplanade. Aku Bersahaja was released in Singapore and Malaysia and to date, is his eighth Malay No. 1 radio chart topper.

For his achievements in the local music scene, he was honoured with the Yahoo! "Singapore Most Influential Person in Entertainment 2011".

In 2012, his hit ballad 'Usah Lepaskan' was also voted the Most Iconic Song in 55 years of Malay music in Singapore. July of that year saw his return to the English music scene with a new single Sky's The Limit which featured the voice of popular singer-actress Rui En.

Sky's The Limit hit the No. 1 position on 98.7 FM Top 20 Countdown Chart for two consecutive weeks on 7 and 14 September, a rare feat for a local song as the Chart is usually dominated by international acts.

Taufik represented Singapore at the first ABU TV Song Festival 2012 at the KBS Concert Hall, in Seoul, South Korea on 14 October 2012. He performed his multi-award-winning composition -Usah Lepaskan at the international gala music concert alongside high-profile music talents from across the region, including TVXQ (Korea), Havana Brown (Australia), Hafiz Suip (Malaysia) and Perfume (Japan).

Aku Bersahaja with Rossa was nominated for "Lagu Bahasa Melayu Terbaik yang Dipersembahkan oleh Artis Luar Negara" (Best Malay Song performance By A Foreign Artist) at the upcoming Malaysia's annual music award – Anugerah Industri Muzik (AIM) 19, and also for "Kolaborasi Terbaik" (Best Collaboration) in Singapore's Malay regional music Anugerah Planet Muzik.

Taufik also rose in the ranks of the regional and international music scene when he received significant recognition from Korea's Mnet Asia Music Awards (MAMA) for Best Asian Artist (Singapore) as well as Anugerah Planet Muzik's Best Collaboration (for Aku Bersahaja), Most Popular Singapore Artiste and Most Popular Regional Artiste.

On 1 October 2014, Taufik released his fifth studio album, Fique, which he produced, arranged and wrote all but one song. Fique features duets with Malay rapper Altimet, singer Shila Amzah and his aunt, Maria Bachok. Reviewing Fique in The Straits Times, Eddino Abdul Hadi awarded the album four out of five stars and wrote that it was "not so much Taufik, 32, reinventing himself as it is him taking the best parts of his past and moulding them into one cohesive work...a solid collection of songs." TODAYs Kenneth Choy awarded Fique four out of five, calling the album "[e]xpressive, emotive and energetic" plus "truly a good comeback effort with just about the right mix of material that will appeal to new and current fans alike."

At the Anugerah Planet Muzik 2014, Taufik won three awards: Most Popular Song (Singapore), Most Popular Artist and Social Media Icon, winning the most awards by any artist that year. Taufik also performed three songs, including his new single, '#AwakKatMane' (Where Are You), off his recent album, Fique.

In 2018, Taufik represented Singapore at the ASEAN-JAPAN Music Festival in Tokyo, performing alongside Dato Sri Siti Nurhaliza (Malaysia), W-inds (Japan), Sarah Geronimo (Philippines), Andien (Indonesia) and Dong Nhi (Vietnam).

In 2019, Taufik performs the National Day Parade 2019 theme song "Our Singapore", alongside Stefanie Sun, JJ Lin, Ramli Sarip, Dick Lee, Kit Chan, Sam Willows and an inter-generation cast.

Personal life
In July 2018, Taufik started a restaurant called 'Chix Hot Chicken' which offers fried chicken served in “Nashville-style” style, at 1 Jalan Pisang, with his longtime friend Bober Ismail.

In September 2019, Taufik joined his elder brother Mustaffa, as a registered property agent under Propnex Realty Pte Ltd to expand himself as an entrepreneur, under the name Batisah Bros Property.

Discography
Studio albums
2005: Blessings
2006: All Because of You
2007: Teman Istimewa
2008: Suria Hatikuu
2014: Fique

Other albums
2005: Shooting Stars Original Soundtrack
2010: Fried Rice Paradise – The Musical Soundtrack
2011: Kenangan Di Hari Raya

VCD
2005: An Evening with Taufik

Singles
 2005: Reach out for the Skies (National Day Parade Theme Song)
 2006: Let Her Go
 2006: I Don't Know
 2009: Addicted
 2011: Aku Bersahaja (duet with Rossa)
 2012: Sky's The Limit (feat. Rui En)
 2013: Ikrar Kasih (OST Luluhnya Sebuah Ikrar)
 2014: Awak Kat Mane
 2015: Izinkanku (Campaign song for Pioneer Generation Package) 
 2016: Like Fireflies (with Ning Baizura & Fazura, composed by Estranged Band | Firefly Airline Campaign song
 2017: Untuk Kita (Theme song for telemovie "Gunting")
 2017: Memilih Mencintaimu (feat. Adira)
 2017: Everyday Heros(Theme Song for Home Team Show and Festival)
 2017: High On Love (Theme Song for Anti-Drug Abuse Campaign)
 2018: Ayu (Song collaboration with Malaysian rapper Altimet)
 2022: Stronger Together (National Day Parade Theme Song)

Filmography

Television

Film

Stage
2010 : Fried Rice Paradise – The Musical

Awards

2006

Pesta! Pesta! Pesta! – Most Sellable Artiste
Anugerah Planet Muzik 2006 – Most Popular Male Artiste
MTV Asia Awards 2006 – Favourite Artist Singapore
Nickelodeon Kids' Choice Award 2006 – Kids' Choice Award Wannabe Award (Singapore)

2007

Pesta Perdana 9 – Most Popular Male Personality
Nickelodeon Kids' Choice Award 2007 – Kids' Choice Award Wannabe Award (Singapore)
Anugerah Planet Muzik 2007 – Most Popular Singapore Artiste
Anugerah Planet Muzik 2007 – Most Popular Singapore Song ("Usah Lepaskan")
Anugerah Planet Muzik 2007 – Best Local Singapore Song ("Usah Lepaskan")

2008

Anugerah Planet Muzik 2008 – Most Popular Singapore Artiste
Anugerah Planet Muzik 2008 – Most Popular Singapore Song ("Berserah")
Anugerah Planet Muzik 2008 – Best Singapore Artiste
Singapore Youth Award 2008 (Arts and Culture)

2009

Composers and Authors Society of Singapore (Compass) Award – Top Local Malay Pop Song ("Usah Lepaskan")
Anugerah Planet Muzik 2009 – Most Popular Singapore Artiste

2010

Manja Star Award ("Anugerah Bintang Manja") 2010
AnugeraHitz.sg 2010 – Best Artiste
AnugeraHitz.sg 2010 – Best Composer ("Nafasku")
AnugeraHitz.sg 2010 – Best Album ("Suria Hatiku")
AnugeraHitz.sg 2010 – Most Popular Song ("Nafasku")
AnugeraHitz.sg 2010 – Most Popular Song ("KepadaNya")
AnugeraHitz.sg 2010 – Most Popular Artiste

2011

Yahoo! Singapore – Singapore 9 Award (in Entertainment Category)

2012

MediaCorp Suria BandStand Elektra –  MOST ICONIC SONG – VIEWERS CHOICE ("Usah Lepaskan")
Anugerah Planet Muzik 2012 – Most Popular Singapore Artiste
Anugerah Planet Muzik 2012 – Most Popular Regional Artiste
Anugerah Planet Muzik 2012 – Best Collaboration, with Indonesia's Rossa in the song "Aku Bersahaja"
Mnet Asian Music Awards 2012 – Best Asian Artist (Singapore)

2013
Sri Temasek Award 2013 – Sri Temasek Promising Award

2014
Anugerah Planet Muzik 2014 - Most Popular Song (Singapore)
Anugerah Planet Muzik 2014 - Most Popular Artist
Anugerah Planet Muzik 2014 - Social Media Icon

2015
Anugerah Planet Muzik 2015-Social Media Icon
Anugerah Planet Muzik 2015-Most Popular Song (Singapore)
Anugerah Planet Muzik 2015-APM Most Popular Song
Anugerah Planet Muzik 2015-MOST POPULAR ARTISTE (SINGAPORE)

2017

 Composers and Authors Society of Singapore (Compass) Award – Top Local Malay Pop Song ("Awak Kat Mane")

2019
Pesta Perdana 2019 TV Awards [Best Actor in a Leading Role - Drama Special] for telemovie “Gunting”

References

External links
All Taufik Batisah's News

 
TaufikBatisah.net
Taufik-Batisah.net
HYPE RECORDS

1981 births
Idols (TV series) winners
Living people
Singaporean people of Bugis descent
Singaporean people of Indian descent
Singaporean people of Malay descent
Singaporean Muslims
21st-century Singaporean male singers